Interlachen High School is a public high school located in Interlachen, Florida, United States, operated by the Putnam County School Board. The principal is Bryan Helms.

Students 
There are currently 846 students enrolled at Interlachen High School. Most of the students come from close by middle schools C.H. Price Middle School, and Q.I. Roberts Middle School.

Interlachen High boasts much diversity: 
 75% of students are white
 12% of students are Hispanic
 10% of students are black

There is a 5% dropout rate and a 70% graduation rate. Sixty percent of the students qualify for free or reduced lunch, which is a significant increase from the state average of forty-six percent. The student-to-teacher ratio is approximately 20:1.

Academics 
Interlachen High School offers standard and Honors courses in the core curriculum (language arts, mathematics, social studies, science). An array of vocational programs are offered as well, including Agriscience, Business, Junior Reserve Officer Training Corps, Criminal Justice and Health Science. Performing arts courses include Drama, Yearbook, Band, Color Guard, Culinary Arts, and Drawing/Painting.

IHS also has many after-school and extra-curricular programs. The school holds branches of several nationally recognized clubs, such as National Honor Society and Future Farmers of America. Other clubs include: Literacy Circle, Fellowship of Christian Students, and Circle of Diversity and Equality.

Band 
Interlachen High School's band actively competes in competitions and festivals. From 1993 to 2005, the band held a "Superior" rating streak from the Florida Music Educators Association. In the summer of 2007, the band traveled to London, England, to perform in front of Westminster Abbey. The color guard is among the few to have performed at Westminster Abbey. In 2009 the band also received a "Superior" at the Florida Bandmasters Association for marching with their show La Nouba.

Athletics 
Interlachen High School has a long and rich history of school sports. Hanging in the wall of its gymnasium are banners containing many proud achievements of athletes throughout the years, from District to State Champions. As recently as 2011 students from Interlachen High have entered in championships at the state level and placed in the top 10.

Baseball 
Jeff Finch's Varsity baseball team for 2008-2009 school year beat UCHS by the slaughter rule(10 points or more after 4th inning) for the first time in the school's history during the semi-final round of the District Championship, 
Interlachen went to finals against KHHS and was defeated, 10-6.

Notable staff
Willie Offord, head football coach (2009–2011)

References

External links 
 , with school information (including course catalog, bell schedules, pictures, etc.)

High schools in Putnam County, Florida
Educational institutions established in 1968
Public high schools in Florida